Emmanuel Tzanes (1610 – 28 March 1690), also known as Bounialis  Emmanuel Tzane-Bounialis, Emmanuel Zane, and Emmanuel Tzane.  He was a Greek Renaissance painter.  He was an author, clergyman, painter, and educator.  He was the parish priest of the church of San Giorgio dei Greci.  An important Greek church in Venice.  He was affiliated with the Flanginian School of the Greek Confraternity in Venice.  He was a prominent painter.  His known works number over 130 pieces.  His works can be found in public foundations, private collections, churches and monasteries in Greece.  He collaborated with many artists namely Philotheos Skoufos.  Both artists were members of the Cretan School.  He was influenced by the Venetian school.  Emmanuel's brothers were famous painter Konstantinos Tzanes and poet Marinos Tzanes.  His most popular work is The Holy Towel finished in 1659.

History

Tzanes was born in Rethymno, Crete.  He became a priest sometime before 1637.  He fled Crete around 1646 because Rethymno was conquered by the Ottomans.  He first traveled to Corfu.  He remained there for eight years.  He painted numerous icons and collaborated with Philotheos Skoufos.  In early 1655, he traveled to Venice where he remained for the rest of his life.  In March of 1655, he submitted an application to become the priest of San Giorgio dei Greci and offered to paint the church for free.  His application was denied. Philotheos Skoufos was the priest at the church.  Eventually, in 1660 Tzanes was elected the parish priest of the Greek Orthodox Church San Giorgio dei Greci.  He replaced Philotheos Skoufos.  Tzanes served for 20 years.  He married 26 people between 1660-1689.  He was also the supervisor at the Flanginian School of the Greek Confraternity in Venice.

Emmanuel's career spanned over 60 years.  One hundred thirty works are dated between 1636 to 1689.  His paintings differ in size shape and style ranging from small icons and triptychs.  He also completed monumental paintings and sanctuary doors.  He followed the rules and styles of the Cretan School which he studied in Rethymno.  He also heavily influenced the Heptanese School.  His clients were both Catholic and Greek Orthodox.  He frequently included his patrons in his paintings and also dated his works.  He regularly painted Saint Alypios the Stylite, Saint Govdelaas the Persian, and Saint Demetrios on Horseback.  He also painted many icons of the Virgin and Christ enthroned.  His painting of Saint Spyridon is of Monumental size.  His brother Konstantinos Tzanes was an active painter and lived in Venice with him.

Gallery

Timeline of artistic works

Crete

1636 Saint Spyridon (Correr Museum, Venice)
1640 Evangelism (Berlin State Museums)
1641 Theotokos Amolintos (Madonna and Child) (Museum of Zakynthos)
1644 The Tree of Jesse (Hellenic Institute of Venice)
1645 Theotokos Odigitria (Madonna and Child) (Holy Trinity Giudecca, Venice)
1645 Agios Antonios (Panagia ton Xenon, Corfu)
1646 Timios Prodromos (John the Baptist) (Church of Timios Prodromos, Kranidi)

Corfu

1648 Christ in Glory (Metropolitan Palace, Corfu)
1648 Saint Cyril (Byzantine and Christian Museum, Athens)
1649 Agios Iason (Church of Saints Jason and Sosipatros, Corfu)
1650 Agios Sosipater (Church of Saints Jason and Sosipatros, Corfu)
1650 Theotokos Enthroned (Church of Saints Jason and Sosipatros, Corfu)
1651 Theotokos (Virgin) Madre della Consolazione (Monastery of Platytera, Corfu)
1654 Saint Cyril of Alexandria (Museum of Antivouniotissa)
1654 Agios (Saint) Ioannis o Damaskinos (Church of Saints Jason and Sosipatros, Corfu)
1654 Saint Gregory of Palamas (Church of Saints Jason and Sosipatros, Corfu)
1655 Agios (Saint) Gavdelaas (Private Collection, Venice)

Venice
1656 Agios (Saint) Dimitrios (Loverdos Collection)
1657 Do not touch me (Antivouniotissa, Corfu)
1657 The Virgin Mary Madre della Consolazionne
1657 Saint Mark (Tzanes)
1662 Saint Onuphrius (Tzanes)
1664 Christ Enthroned (Tzanes)
1671 Saint Theodora (Tzanes)
1684 Lady the Lambovitissa

Literary works

Satisfaction is beneficial for every Christian (In Greek)

Sequence of the holy great martyr Fotini of Samaritan, or Christ spoke in the well (In Greek)

Narration with lyrics of the terrible war that took place on the island of Crete (In Greek)

See also
Greek scholars in the Renaissance
Georgios Klontzas
Theodore Poulakis
Manolis Hatzidakis

References

Bibliography

 
1610 births
1690 deaths
Cretan Renaissance painters
Greek Renaissance humanists
17th-century Greek people
Italian people of Greek descent
People from Rethymno
17th-century Greek painters
Artist authors
Painters of the Heptanese School
Greek Baroque painters